The Pomeranian State Museum in Greifswald, Western Pomerania, is a public museum primarily dedicated to Pomeranian history and arts. The largest exhibitions show archeological findings and artefacts from the Pomerania region and paintings, e.g. of Caspar David Friedrich, a Greifswald local, such as Ruins of Eldena Abbey in the Riesengebirge. The museum was established in the years of 1998 to 2005 at the site of the historical Franziskaner abbey.

Near Binz on the nearby isle of Rügen, a satellite of the museum is under construction at Jagdschloss Granitz, a former hunting lodge of the Rugian princes. This branch will be designated to Rugian history.

An early 20th century museum in Stettin, then capital of the Province of Pomerania, was the "Provinzialmuseum pommerscher Altertümer", which was also named "Pommersches Landesmuseum" (Pomerania State Museum) since 1934.

Gallery

Literature 
 Stefan Fassbinder: Vom Kloster zum Museum - 750 Jahre Geschichte zwischen Mühlenstraße und Stadtmauer in Greifswald. In: Klöster und monastische Kultur in Hansestädten. Kolloquium Stralsund 2001. Stralsunder Beiträge zur Archäologie, Geschichte, Kunst und Volkskunde in Vorpommern, Band 4. Rahden 2003, S. 157–164.
 Stefan Fassbinder, Das Pommersche Landesmuseum. Von der Idee bis zur Eröffnung. in Greifswalder Beiträge. Band 2, 2005, pp. 47–50.
 Frank Schmitz, Armin Wenzel, Pommersches Landesmuseum Greifswald, 2007,

References

External links 
 
 Bundestransferstelle Städtebaulicher Denkmalschutz
Pomeranian State Museum within Google Arts & Culture

History of Pomerania
Pomerania
Museums in Mecklenburg-Western Pomerania
Local museums in Germany
Art museums and galleries in Germany
Greifswald